Carlyle Atkinson (4 December 1892 – 5 August 1968) was an English competitive swimmer who represented Great Britain at the 1912 Summer Olympics in Stockholm, Sweden.  Atkinson advanced to the semi-finals of the men's 200-metre breaststroke before being eliminated.  He finished ninth overall.

He was born in Darwen, Lancashire, England, and died in Napier, New Zealand.

References

External links
Carlyle Atkinson's profile at Sports Reference.com

1892 births
1968 deaths
English male swimmers
Male breaststroke swimmers
Olympic swimmers of Great Britain
People from Darwen
Swimmers at the 1912 Summer Olympics
British emigrants to New Zealand